Holosticha is a genus of littoral ciliates.

Species 
According to the Catalogue of Life, 77 species are accepted within Holosticha.

 Holosticha alpestris Kahl, 1932
 Holosticha antarctica Wilbert & Song, 2008
 Holosticha apodiademata Wilbert & Song, 2008
 Holosticha aquarum
 Holosticha arenicola Kahl, 1932
 Holosticha brachysticha Foissner, Agatha & Berger, 2002
 Holosticha bradburyae Gong, Song, Hu, Ma & Zhu, 2001
 Holosticha brevis Kahl, 1932
 Holosticha corlissi
 Holosticha coronata (Vuxanovici, 1963) Buitkamp, 1977
 Holosticha coronata Gourret & Roeser, 1888
 Holosticha crassa Claparède & Lachmann, 1858
 Holosticha danubialis Kaltenbach, 1960
 Holosticha decolor Wallengren, 1900
 Holosticha diademata Rees, 1884
 Holosticha distyla Buitkamp, 1977
 Holosticha dragescoi
 Holosticha estuarii
 Holosticha extensa Kahl, 1932
 Holosticha fascicola
 Holosticha flavicans Kahl, 1932
 Holosticha flavorubra
 Holosticha foissneri Petz, Song & Wilbert, 1995
 Holosticha fontinalis Lepsi, 1926
 Holosticha fossicola Kahl, 1932
 Holosticha gibba Stein, 1859
 Holosticha gibba (Müller, 1786) Wrzesniowski, 1877
 Holosticha globulifera Kahl, 1932
 Holosticha gracilis Kahl, 1932
 Holosticha grisea Kahl, 1932
 Holosticha hamatula Lei, Xu & Choi, 2005
 Holosticha helluo
 Holosticha heterofoissneri Hu & Song, 2001
 Holosticha holomilnei
 Holosticha intermedia Bergh, 1889
 Holosticha islandica Berger & Foissner, 1989
 Holosticha lacteus Kahl, 1932
 Holosticha macronucleata
 Holosticha magnificus Kahl, 1932
 Holosticha manca Kahl, 1932
 Holosticha mancoidea Hemberger, 1985
 Holosticha marioni Gourret & Roeser, 1888
 Holosticha martimum Wang & Nie, 1932
 Holosticha micans
 Holosticha milnei Kahl, 1932
 Holosticha minima
 Holosticha mononucleata Gelei, 1954
 Holosticha multinucleata Maupas, 1883
 Holosticha muscicola Gellert, 1956
 Holosticha muscorum (Kahl, 1932) Foissner, 1982
 Holosticha muscorum Kahl, 1932
 Holosticha musculus Kahl, 1932
 Holosticha mystacea (Stein, 1859) 
 Holosticha mystacina Stein, 1859
 Holosticha oblonga Schewiakoff, 1893
 Holosticha oculata Mereschkowsky, 1877
 Holosticha ovalis Kahl, 1932
 Holosticha piscis
 Holosticha polystylata Borror & Wicklow, 1983
 Holosticha pulchra Kahl, 1932
 Holosticha pullaster (Müller, 1773) Foissner, Blatterer, Berger & Kohmann, 1991
 Holosticha punctata Rees, 1884
 Holosticha randani
 Holosticha rhomboedrica (Vuxanovici, 1963) Buitkamp, 1977
 Holosticha scutellum Cohn, 1866
 Holosticha setifera Kahl, 1932
 Holosticha simplex
 Holosticha simplicis Wang & Nie, 1932
 Holosticha sphagni
 Holosticha spindleri Petz, Song & Wilbert, 1995
 Holosticha stagnatilis Stokes, 1891
 Holosticha thiophaga Kahl, 1928
 Holosticha thononensis Dragesco, 1966
 Holosticha velox Quennerstedt, 1869
 Holosticha venalis Stokes, 1887
 Holosticha vernalis Stokes, 1887
 Holosticha violacea Kahl, 1928
 Holosticha wrzesniowskii Mereschkowsky, 1877

References

Further reading 
 Li, Liqiong, et al. "A redescription of the marine hypotrichous ciliate, Nothoholosticha fasciola (Kahl, 1932) nov. gen., nov. comb.(Ciliophora: Urostylida) with brief notes on its cellular reorganization and SS rRNA gene sequence." European journal of protistology 45.3 (2009): 237–248.
 Gong, Jun, et al. "Morphology and infraciliature of Holosticha bradburyae nov. spec.(Ciliophora, Hypotrichida) from the Yellow Sea, China."Hydrobiologia 464.1-3 (2001): 63–69.

Hypotrichea

Eukaryote genera
Taxa described in 1877